Monica Dinescu-Iagăr (born April 2, 1973 in Sighetu Marmaţiei) is a Romanian athlete competing in high jump. Her personal best jump is 2.02 metres.

She made her international debut in 1995 but went through a six-month drug suspension in 1996. In 1998 she won the indoor with 1.96 m and outdoor European Championships with 1.97 m. She also won the 1999 Universiade and also won the Hochsprung mit Musik meet that year. She finished 8th at the 2004 Summer Olympics.

See also
List of sportspeople sanctioned for doping offences

External links

1973 births
Living people
Romanian female high jumpers
People from Sighetu Marmației
Athletes (track and field) at the 2000 Summer Olympics
Athletes (track and field) at the 2004 Summer Olympics
Doping cases in athletics
Olympic athletes of Romania
European Athletics Championships medalists
Universiade medalists in athletics (track and field)
Universiade gold medalists for Romania
Universiade silver medalists for Romania
Medalists at the 1999 Summer Universiade